Dugurdspiggen Peak is an isolated peak about  north of the Borg Massif in Queen Maud Land. It was mapped by Norwegian cartographers from surveys and air photos by Norwegian–British–Swedish Antarctic Expedition (1949–52) and from air photos by the Norwegian expedition (1958–59) and named Dugurdspiggen (the second breakfast peak).

References 

Mountains of Queen Maud Land
Princess Martha Coast